The Cannes Open was a men's professional golf tournament that was played annually from 1979 to 1998. From 1984 it was an event on the European Tour, and returned to the schedule as a one-off event in 2001 to replace the Estoril Open, which was cancelled by organisers due to security concerns following the 9/11 attacks in the United States.

The tournament had several different sponsored names. The winners included two major championship winners, Seve Ballesteros and Ian Woosnam. The prize fund peaked at £403,570 in 1996 before falling to £300,000 in 1998, which was the smallest on the European Tour that season. It was without a title sponsor that year, for the only time apart from 1988 and was subsequently cancelled.

Greg Norman won the 1983 event which was held in September, the same week as the St. Mellion Timeshare TPC on the European Tour. Frenchmen Jean Garaïalde (1980 and 1982) and Géry Watine (1981) were other winners prior to the tournament joining the European Tour schedule in 1984.

Winners

Notes

References

External links
Coverage on the European Tour's official site

Former European Tour events
Defunct golf tournaments in France
Sport in Cannes
Recurring sporting events established in 1979
Recurring sporting events disestablished in 2001
1979 establishments in France
2001 disestablishments in France